The 2024 United States Senate election in Pennsylvania will be held on November 5, 2024, to elect a member of the United States Senate to represent the state of Pennsylvania. Incumbent three-term Democratic Senator Bob Casey Jr. has not yet announced if he'll run for a fourth term.

Background 
A typical swing state, Pennsylvania is considered to be a purple state at the federal level, especially since in the 2020 presidential election, Joe Biden carried Pennsylvania by about 1 percentage point. However, the Democratic Party has seen success in the state in recent years. Democrats control both U.S. Senate seats, the Governorship, and a majority of its U.S. Representatives in its congressional delegation. While the last time Republicans won a senate seat was in 2016.

Casey was first elected in 2006, defeating then-incumbent senator Rick Santorum by about 15 percentage points. He was re-elected in 2012 by 9 percentage points and in 2018 by 13 percentage points .

This race is viewed as competitive given the state's nearly even partisan lean. Many believe that with Senator Casey's cancer diagnosis that he will not run for re-election. Most analysts agree if he does run for re-election it will be a close race anyways.

Democratic primary

Candidates

Potential
Bob Casey Jr., incumbent U.S. Senator (2007–present)

Republican primary

Candidates

Publicly expressed interest
Doug Mastriano, state senator for SD-33 (2019–present) and nominee for Governor of Pennsylvania in 2022
David McCormick, former U.S. Under Secretary of the Treasury for International Affairs (2007–2009), former CEO of Bridgewater Associates (2020–2022), and candidate for U.S. Senate in 2022 (decision expected in late 2023)

Potential
Stacy Garrity, Pennsylvania State Treasurer (2021–present)
Carla Sands, former U.S. Ambassador to Denmark and candidate for U.S. Senate in 2022
Mehmet Oz, former cardiologist, former host of The Dr. Oz Show, and nominee for U.S. Senate in 2022

Declined
Kathy Barnette, author, political commentator, nominee for PA-04 in 2020, and candidate for U.S. Senate in 2022

Endorsements

Independents

Candidates

Filed paperwork 
Reece Wright-McDonald, writer

General election

Predictions

Notes

References

External links
Official campaign websites
 Bob Casey (D) for Senate

2024
Pennsylvania
United States Senate